Born to Be Wild is a 1938 American action film directed by Joseph Kane and written by Nathanael West. The film stars Ralph Byrd, Doris Weston, Ward Bond, Robert Emmett Keane, Ben Hewlett and Charles Williams. The film was released on February 16, 1938, by Republic Pictures.

Plot
Two reckless truckers are asked to deliver a load of lettuce, but among the way they are stopped by farm workers on strike, they learn that the cargo is actually dynamite and that they have to take that dynamite into a jammed dam and blow it up.

Cast
Ralph Byrd as Steve Hackett
Doris Weston as Mary Stevens
Ward Bond as Bill Purvis
Robert Emmett Keane as J. Stearns Davis
Ben Hewlett as Wilson
Charles Williams as Company Spotter
Davison Clark as Stranger
Byron Foulger as Husband
George Anderson as Mayor
Edwin Stanley as Randolph
Ben Hendricks Jr. as Deputy
Sterlita Peluffo as Manuela
Lew Kelly as Reilly
Harrison Greene as J. Carroll Malloy
George Magrill as Hank
Anna Demetrio as Cristobella
Dan White (actor) Striker (uncredited)

References

External links
 

1938 films
American action films
1930s action films
Republic Pictures films
Films directed by Joseph Kane
American black-and-white films
1930s English-language films
1930s American films